Claude William Cooper (April 1, 1892 in Troup, Texas – January 21, 1974 in Plainview, Texas) was an outfielder in Major League Baseball from 1913 to 1917.

In 373 games over five seasons, Cooper posted a .260 batting average (283-for-1089) scoring 156 runs, with 4 home runs and 104 RBI. He finished his career with a .955 fielding percentage playing at all three outfield positions and first base.

Sources

Major League Baseball outfielders
1892 births
1974 deaths
New York Giants (NL) players
Brooklyn Tip-Tops players
Philadelphia Phillies players
Major League Baseball left fielders
Baseball players from Texas
TCU Horned Frogs baseball players
Fort Worth Panthers players
Baltimore Orioles (IL) players
Jersey City Skeeters players
Los Angeles Angels (minor league) players
Oakland Oaks (baseball) players
Sacramento Senators players
People from Troup, Texas